Claude Harriott (born April 8, 1981) is a former American football defensive end.

Early years
Harriott played high school football at Glades Central Community High School in Belle Glade, Florida. He played college football at Pittsburgh.

Professional career
Harriott began his professional career in the National Football League by being drafted by the Chicago Bears in the fifth round of the 2004 NFL Draft. He did not make the roster, being released in the final cut.

In January 2005, he signed with the New York Giants but was released that April.

 Claude was drafted in the first round to the Amsterdam Admirals of NFL Europa in January 2006 NFL Europe Draft. He appeared in World Bowl XIV.In June of 2006, Harriott signed with the Detroit Lions. He arrived in Detroit, he attended training camp but again was released in the final cut. He was signed to the [(practice squad)] and to the active roster in December but did not play.

Being released by the Lions in September 2007, he signed to the practice squad of the Kansas City Chiefs where he remained until December. He then re-signed with Detroit.

In 2008, he attended training camp with the Lions but was again released in the final cut.

On September 15, 2008, Harriott signed a practice roster agreement with the Toronto Argonauts of the Canadian Football League and joined the active roster on September 20. His performance in the seven final games of the season with 20 defensive tackles, 2 sacks, 1 forced fumble, 3 tackles for a loss, and 1 pass knockdown impressed the Argos enough to extend his contract through the 2010 CFL season.  On May 27, 2010, the Argonauts released him, stating his knee injury as the primary reason.

Omaha Nighthawks
Harriott was signed by the Omaha Nighthawks on June 10, 2011. He played with them until the United Football League folded in the middle  of the 2012 season.

References

External links
Just Sports Stats

1981 births
Living people
American football defensive ends
Pittsburgh Panthers football players
Chicago Bears players
New York Giants players
Detroit Lions players
Amsterdam Admirals players
Kansas City Chiefs players
Canadian football defensive linemen
Toronto Argonauts players
People from Westmoreland Parish
Jamaican players of American football
Omaha Nighthawks players